The Marsden Gemini is a Canadian mid-wing, T-tailed, two-seats in side-by-side configuration, experimental research glider that was designed and constructed by David Marsden at the University of Alberta, first flying in 1973.

Design and development
The Gemini was designed to explore the use of flaps to create a variable geometry sailplane that would be optimized for both low speed thermalling flight and also high speed gliding between thermals.

The aircraft was predominantly made from aluminium, with some stainless steel used for the wing ribs, controls and fittings. The two-place side-by-side cockpit was made from fibreglass. Its four-piece  span high aspect ratio wing employed a modified Wortmann FX-61-163/35SF airfoil. The Fowler flaps occupied the entire trailing edge of the wing and accounted for 35% of the wing chord. In cruise the flaps were retracted, reducing the wing area. While climbing, the flaps were extended, producing a high lift coefficient of 2.2. For glidepath control when landing the flaps deployed to 80° to create aerodynamic drag. The outer flaps acted as slotted ailerons for roll control.

Operational history
Only one Gemini was built. The aircraft was still operational in August 2011, owned by William G. Osoba of Wichita, Kansas, United States, but was removed from the US register in April 2019 and its fate is unknown.

The aircraft was flown to set seven Canadian multi-place records, including the record for speed over a  triangle.

On July 2, 2011, Osoba and his wife Christine flew the Gemini on a  free distance flight from Zapata, Texas to just east of Amarillo, Texas, a flight which won the 2011 Barringer Trophy.

Specifications (Gemini)

See also

References

1970s Canadian sailplanes
Canadian experimental aircraft
Aircraft first flown in 1973
Mid-wing aircraft
T-tail aircraft